The Reifenstein schools were the various schools of higher education for women associated with the Reifensteiner Verband.

The concept was initiated by Ida von Kortzfleisch, a Prussian noble woman and early German feminist. Reifenstein refers to Reifenstein in Eichsfeld, a municipality in Thuringia and site of the first permanent school. From 1897 to 1990 the Reifensteiner Verband operated about 15 of its own schools and cooperated with further operators. About 40 wirtschaftliche Frauenschulen, rural women economy schools were connected to the Reifenstein concept and movement. The association and its journals provided an alumni network and a job placement service, as well as strengthening home economics (Ekotrophology) as an academic discipline and were important for consumer advice and rural social services over all. About 90,000 women took the higher education courses. Some of the alumni, like Käthe Delius, Marie-Elisabeth Lüders and Freya von Moltke had an important role in German higher education and German society overall.

Background 

Under the German Empire until the early 20th century,  household services played a central role for the employment of women. Instead of a systematic training as in the dual system of vocational education, the education of women in the countryside happened often along a training on the job principle. Young men at this time often gained skills from winter schools and various professional educational institutions. The rural women's education (or their shortcomings) was being deemed a troubled sector and a main topic of the early women's movement.

Already a 1913 doctorate, Joachim Kramer's thesis about the household education in Germany refers to the ongoing reform aspects. The 1870s saw some progress; the first winter schools had been founded by the Badische Frauenverein, founded by Princess Louise of Prussia in the state of Baden. While the winter schools lost their impact to permanent schools in Baden already before World War I, they gained importance in Bavaria in the 1920s. Kramer compared the German situation and the state of household education abroad.  Switzerland, Belgium and Austria had winter schools. The Austrian education for rural women was comparably backward, and Switzerland took a leading position. In France, housekeeping was a topic in primary schools, but not part of higher education. According to Kramer, Iowa and the state of New York in the United States were then leading in the field.

The technical equipment and available technology for households gained importance in the 19th century. According to Hans Jürgen Teuteberg, the household literature then started to address women. Earlier works, like the Hausväterliteratur (Hlaford books, a German kind of early economic literature) addressed the pater familias, male and noble heads of larger rural households. Within the second half of the 19th century, women - as house mother or housewives were being perceived and addressed. The new role of the housewife as head of the household was being deemed a positive development first and only later as "how housewives were being made" being deemed negatively.

Ida von Kortzfleisch 

In 1894, Ida von Kortzfleisch published an article in Tägliche Rundschau, a Berlin newspaper, called The Female compulsory service in the economist college for women. She responded to a series of articles by the writer Otto Leixner about the "Female Question" in Germany. Leixner had loathed the women's rights movement (as Weiberrechtlerinnen) and he had deplored their alleged lack of patriotism. Kortzfleisch asked to establish a female service year, similar to the Einjährige, a year of military service of male graduates of high schools. Ida von Kortzfleisch explicitly associated her efforts with women's right's as a citizen in the Kaiserreich. The controversy distributed to establish higher education for women in the wirtschaftliche Frauenschule.

Development 

The first classes started in Ofleiden, but was transferred to Reifenstein soon after. The states of Prussia provided an official acknowledgement in 1909. In 1913, the Reifenstein association was admitted to the Bund Deutscher Frauenvereine. The conservative and basically Protestant background did not hinder a cooperation with the Jüdische Frauenbund (Jewish women's association), which established a Jewish Reifenstein school in Wolfratshausen in 1926. 

The Reifenstein association and its schools was included in the Reichsnährstand in 1934. The noble background of various pupils and the close connection to the Protestant church lead to some clashes with the regime.  

Bad Weilbach, Chattenbühl, Obernkirchen, Wittgenstein and Wöltingerode reopened 1946 in the western occupation zones. The eastern parts went into state ownership in 1947. Some of the schools in the far Eastern part of Prussia, e.g. the Landfrauenschule Metgethen have been destroyed during the end of war. The 1960s saw major changes in the concept, e.g. the end of the compulsory maiden costume. The first male student was admitted 1980. The last two schools closed down in the 1990s and are now part of a Protestant youth organization.

Trivia 
Marie-Elisabeth Lüders reported about mocking remarks from Berlin friends about the rural sites and background of the schools. Carry Brachvogel provided material for improved household knowledge in Bavaria. She deplored the lack of quality cuisine in the free state of Bavaria and expected some improvements via the training courses provided by teachers trained in Reifenstein schools. The Bayerische Kochbuch (Bavarian Cookbook), a still famous household item, is not about specific Bavarian menus, but is based on the experience of the school in Miesbach.

Famous pupils  
 Elisabeth von Barsewisch and Gisa von Barsewisch, authors
 Caroline Hermine and Henriette, daughters of  German Emperor Wilhelm II, in Obernkirchen
 Käthe Delius, (1893–1977), longtime head of Bundesforschungsanstalt für Hauswirtschaft, the federal research institute for household economy 
 Friederike Luise von Hannover, later Queen of Greece, 1937 in Obernkirchen
 Marie-Elisabeth Lüders 1899 in Nieder-Ofleiden, German feminist and politician
 Freya von Moltke, member of the 20 July movement
 Ruth von Kalkreuth, pioneer of the Landfrauenmovement in Württemberg 
 Elisabeth von Thadden, educator and member of the 20 July resistance movement
 Ernestine von Trott zu Solz, social work activist
 Verena Lafferentz, granddaughter of Richard Wagner, Obernkirchen 1936/37

List of schools 
The table contains schools owned by the Reifensteiner Verband. A further 25 schools have been associated with the Reifenstein concept, among them a school in Stift Finn in Estonia (1922–1939) and Lehrfarm (training farm) Brakwater, near Windhuk in the then German colony of Südwestafrika (Namibia). The name of Maid (older German for Miss or maiden) refers to the acronym Mut, Ausdauer, Idealismus und Demut (Courage, perseverance, idealism and humility). The symbols worne by the Maiden are valuable collectors items in the meanwhile, some tried to relate them with the Arbeitsmaiden of the Nazi Reichsarbeitsdienst, which are however not connected in any way.

Further reading

Historical studies and documents 
 Allgemeine Vereinsschrift des Reifensteiner Vereins, Gotha 1915 (advertisement of 1915)
 J. Frick: Wie wird man in Preußen Lehrerin der landwirtschaftlichen Haushaltungskunde? Zweite Auflage 1914 (How to become a female house economics teacher in Prussia) 
 Anna von Heydekampf, Maidenstammliste, Gotha : Schmidt & Thelow, 1925 (Members list)
 Ida von Kortzfleisch, Das Maidenbuch 1910 (von Kortzfleischs study book about the Maidens knowledge)
 Johannes Kramer: Das ländlich-hauswirtschaftliche Bildungswesen in Deutschland, Dissertation an der Universität Erlangen, Fulda 1913
 Das Maidenblatt : Organ des Reifensteiner Verbandes für Haus- und Landwirtschaftliche Frauenbildung e. V. und des Maidenbundes, Gotha Schmidt & Thelow 1916–1942
 Preußen Ministerium für Landwirtschaft, Domänen und Forsten: Die Bestimmungen des Herrn Ministers für Landwirtschaft, Domänen und Forsten über die Ausbildung von Lehrerinnen der Landwirtschaftlichen Haushaltungskunde vom 30. März 1914 : Sonderabzug für den Reifensteiner Verein für wirtschaftliche Frauenschulen auf dem Lande, Ministerialblatt für 1914, Berlin Unger (1914 official document about essentials for female teachers in house economics in Prussia)

Publications  
 Lotte Matschoss, Die Schneiderpuppe aus Papier, Berlin: Reifensteiner Frauenschulverlag, 1930
 Lotte Matschoss, Farben und ihre Anwendung im täglichen Leben, Reifensteiner Frauenschulverlag, 1930
 Reifensteiner Wäscheregeln Gotha : Schmidt & Thelow, [1930], 7. durchges. u. verm. Aufl.
 Luise Senff, Reifensteiner Grundrezepte für Kochen und Backen, Göttingen : Vandenhoeck u. Ruprecht, 1966, 9. Aufl.
 Elsbeth von Oppen, Reifensteiner Einmachrezepte für Obst und Gemüse, Göttingen : Vandenhoeck & Ruprecht, 1960, Neu bearb. 10. Aufl.

Recent studies 
 Ortrud Wörner-Heil: Adelige Frauen als Pionierinnen der Berufsbildung: die ländliche Hauswirtschaft und der Reifensteiner Verband kassel university press GmbH, 2010
 Ortrud Wörner-Heil: Frauenschulen auf dem Lande – Reifensteiner Verband (1897–1997), Schriftenreihe des Archivs der deutschen Frauenbewegung, Band 11, Archiv der Frauenbewegung, 1997
 Anna von Heydekampf (HrsGg.): Ida von Kortzfleisch, ihr Leben und ihr Werk, Gotha, 1927
 Anke Sawahn: Die Frauenlobby vom Land – Die Landfrauenbewegung in Deutschland und ihre Funktionärinnen 1898 bis 1948, DLG-Verlag, 2009
 Juliane Jacobi: Mädchen- und Frauenbildung in Europa – von 1500 bis zur Gegenwart, Campus Verlag, 2013

External links 

 Website of www.reifensteiner-verband.de/
 Museum Obernkirchen
 CJD Siegen webpage
 Niedersachsen archive
 Klosterkirche Reifenstein
 Frauenorte-Niedersachsen

References 

Education in Germany
Women in Germany
Home economics education